Snake blenny (Ophidion barbatum) is a fish species in the family Ophidiidae. It is widespread in the eastern Atlantic from southern England to Senegal in West Africa, and the northern Mediterranean.

Parasites 
As most fish, the Snake blenny harbours a variety of parasites. One of them is the diclidophorid monogenean Flexophora ophidii. The species was described in 1962 by Maria Prost and Louis Euzet from the coasts of France in the Mediterranean Sea  and found 58 years later off Algeria.

References

External links
 

Ophidion (fish)
Fish described in 1758
Taxa named by Carl Linnaeus
Fish of the Atlantic Ocean
Fish of the Adriatic Sea
Fish of the Mediterranean Sea
Fish of Western Asia
Fish of Africa
Fish of Europe